Billy Proctor (born 14 May 1999, in New Zealand) is a New Zealand rugby union player who plays for the  in Super Rugby. His playing position is centre. He has signed for the Hurricanes squad in 2019.

Reference list

External links
itsrugby.co.uk profile

1999 births
New Zealand rugby union players
Living people
Rugby union centres
Wellington rugby union players
Hurricanes (rugby union) players
Māori All Blacks players
Rugby union players from Wellington City